Cleaves Glacier is a glacier in the Holland Range, flowing northwest from Mount Reid into the east side of Robb Glacier. It was mapped by the United States Geological Survey from tellurometer surveys (1961–62) and Navy air photos (1960), and named by the Advisory Committee on Antarctic Names for Harold H. Cleaves, Master of the USNS Pvt. Joseph F. Merrell during Operation Deepfreeze 1964–65.

References
 

Glaciers of the Ross Dependency
Shackleton Coast